Conicosia elongata is a species of succulent plant in the genus Conicosia. It is endemic to the Northern Cape and Western Cape of South Africa.

Conservation status 
Conicosia elongata is classified as Least Concern.

References

External links 
 
 

Endemic flora of South Africa
Flora of South Africa
Flora of the Cape Provinces
Aizoaceae